Lovely's Fifty Fifty is a pizzeria in Portland, Oregon.

History 
The restaurant followed Lovely Hula Hands. The chef is Sarah Minnick.

Lovely's Fifty Fifty was featured on the Netflix series Chef's Table: Pizza in 2022.

Reception
Michael Russell included the pizzeria in The Oregonian 2019 list of the city's 40 best restaurants. The business was included in Eater Portland's 2022 "Handy Dining Guide to North Mississippi Avenue".

See also
 Pizza in Portland, Oregon

References

External links

 
 Lovely's Fifty Fifty at Condé Nast Traveler
 Lovely's Fifty Fifty at Travel + Leisure

Boise, Portland, Oregon
North Portland, Oregon
Pizzerias in Portland, Oregon
Year of establishment missing